Kasper Klostergaard Larsen (born 22 May 1983 in Horsens) is a Danish professional road racing cyclist, riding for Danish-based . In the last part of the 2005 season, the then  rider was taken aboard Team CSC, as the team was then known, as a stagiaire, and was on the hard-working team that helped Lars Bak win the Tour de l'Avenir. His time at Team CSC resulted in a professional contract with the team for the 2006 and 2007 seasons.

Palmares 

2003
7th Overall Tour de Serbie
2004
1st Stage 2 Tour de Berlin
2005
1st Stage 10 International Cycling Classic
2011
3rd Paris–Tours
2012
4th Overall Paris–Corrèze
2013
7th Overall Tour du Loir et Cher
9th Overall Flèche du Sud
10th Overall Olympia's Tour

External links 
 Team Saxo Bank profile.

Danish male cyclists
1983 births
Living people
People from Horsens
Sportspeople from the Central Denmark Region